Scymnus apicanus, the apicanus lady beetle, is a species of dusky lady beetle in the family Coccinellidae. It is found in North America.

Subspecies
These three subspecies belong to the species Scymnus apicanus:
 Scymnus apicanus apicanus J. Chapin, 1973
 Scymnus apicanus borealis Gordon
 Scymnus apicanus pseudapicanus Gordon, 1985

References

Further reading

 

Coccinellidae
Articles created by Qbugbot
Beetles described in 1973